The Municipality of Argos was a municipality of Argolis prefecture which was established by the Kapodistrias Plan from the merging of older communities of the area, which later formed the municipal districts of the municipality. The municipality operated in the period 1999-2010 when it was abolished with the implementation of Kallikratis Plan and joined the new municipality Argos-Mykines as municipal unit. It was located in the northwest of the prefecture and covered a large part of the Argolic plain, up to the mountain Artemisio. It bordered with the municipalities of Koutsopodi, Lyrkeia, Midea, Lerna, Mycenae, Nea Kios and the community of Achladokampos. The municipality had a population of 29,228 inhabitants according to the 2001 census and was the largest municipality in population of Argolida. The seat of the municipality was Argos.

The former municipality and current municipal unit, is subdivided into the following communities and their respective settlements.
 Community of Argos
 Argos
 Akova
 Kokla
 Timenio
 Community of Dalamanara
 Dalamanara
 Community of Elliniko
 Kryoneri
 Elliniko
 Zogka
 Krya Vrysi
 Tourniki
 Community of Ira
 Ira
 Community of Inachos
 Inachos
 Tristrato
 Community of Kefalari
 Kefalari
 Magoula
 Community of Kourtaki
 Kourtaki
 Community of Lalouka
 Lalouka
 Community of Pyrgella
 Pyrgela

Ancient sites
 Kechries or Cenchreae
 Larissa
 Timenio

Mayors of Argos 
The municipality was established in 1834 and operated till 1914 and again since 1925 till 2010 when it was abolished. During 1914-1925, it was downgraded into community, due to having less than 10,000 population. Before the Kapodistrias reform in 1997, municipality of Argos contained only the community of Argos. First mayor was Hristos Vlassis.

1834-1838 Hristos Vlassis
1838-1841, 1852-1855 Konstantinos Vokos
1841-1848 Georgios Tsokris
1848-1852 Konstantinos Rodopoulos
1855-1858 Ioannis Vlassis (and congressman)
1858-1861 Petros Divanis (doctor)
1861-1866 Lambros Lambrinidis
1866-1870 Mihail Pashalinopoulos
1870-1874, 1879-1883 Mihail Papalexopoulos (doctor, congressman, governor)
1874-1875, 1883-1891, 1893-1899 Spilios Kalmouhos
1891-1893 Haralambos Mistakopoulos (1830-1894, died in office)
1899-1903 Emmanouil Roussos (doctor)
1903-1907 Dimitrios P. Kouzis (1870-1958) (senator and congressman)
1907-1914 Andreas Karatzas (lawyer)
1917-1918 Hristos Karagiannis (president of Argos Community)
1925-22 January 1928 Aggelis Bobos (1878-1928) merchant, (died in office)
1928-1941 Konstantinos Bobos (merchant). He succeeded his brother Angelis.
1941-1943 Efthimios Smirniotatkis (lawyer)
1943-1944 Georgios Papagiannopoulos (lawyer)
1944-1945 Konstantinos Dorovinis (dentist)
...
1951-1964 Efstathios Marinos (1902-1990)
1964-1967 Georgios Thomopoulos (1906-1995)
1967-1973 Theodoros Polihronopoulos
1973-1974 Marios Presvelos
1974-1975 (appointment by the government of national unity)
1975-1978 Dimitrios Bonis
1979-1986 Georgios Peirounis (1926-1999)
1987-1998 Dimitrios Papanikolaou (1937-2017)
1999-2002 Nikolaos Koligliatis
2003-2006 Dimitrios Platis
2007-2010 Vasileios Bouris

Links
Official website (archived)

References

Argos